Rothenthurm railway station is a railway station in Rothenthurm, in the Swiss canton of Schwyz. It is an intermediate stop on the standard gauge Pfäffikon–Arth-Goldau line of Südostbahn.

Services 
The following services stop at Rothenthurm:

  Voralpen-Express: hourly service between Lucerne and St. Gallen.
 Lucerne S-Bahn : hourly service between Arth-Goldau and Biberbrugg.

References

External links 
 
 

Railway stations in the canton of Schwyz
Südostbahn stations